"Sunny Days" is a song written and performed by Jars of Clay. It is the second out of two radio singles from the band's 2003 studio album, Who We Are Instead. The first recording of the song during the album's sessions was produced by the band, while the version that ended up on the album was produced by Ron Aniello, who also produced Lifehouse's debut album, No Name Face.

Track listing
"Sunny Days" (Tom Lord-Alge Mix) – 3:25 (Dan Haseltine, Matt Odmark, Stephen Mason, & Charlie Lowell)

Performance Credits
Dan Haseltine - vocals
Charlie Lowell - piano, organ, background vocals
Stephen Mason - guitars, background vocals
Matt Odmark - guitars, background vocals
John Catchings - cello
Ben Mize - drums
Aaron Sands - bass

Technical Credits
Ron Aniello - producer, recording
Tom Lord-Alge - mixing
David Thoener - recording
Clint Roth - recording
Richard Dodd - mastering
Robert Beeson - executive producer

2004 singles
Jars of Clay songs
Songs written by Dan Haseltine
Songs written by Charlie Lowell
Songs written by Stephen Mason (musician)
Songs written by Matt Odmark
Song recordings produced by Ron Aniello
2003 songs
Essential Records (Christian) singles